Frank Black 93–03 is a compilation album by Frank Black, released in June 2007 by Cooking Vinyl. It highlights the 10 years of his solo career after disbanding the influential alternative rock band, the Pixies in 1993, as well as songs from the many albums he created with backing band "the Catholics". Included also is material from his next solo album, Bluefinger, in the form of a hidden track, "Threshold Apprehension". Each release comes with a second disc of live recordings, which varies depending on the region the album was released in. All live tracks were recorded during Black's fall 2006 North American tour.

Track listing

Disc one

Disc two

Personnel
Credits adapted from the album's liner notes, except where noted.

Musicians on best of disc
 Frank Black 
 Jean Black 
 Scott Boutier
 Jason Carter
 Violet Clark
 Andy Diagram 
 Eric Drew Feldman 
 Rich Gilbert
 Bob Guisti 
 Cynthia Haagens
 Dave McCaffrey
 Keith Moliné 
 Van Dyke Parks
 Dave Philips
 Eric Potter
 Stan Ridgway
 Joey Santiago
 Dan Schmid 
 Moris Tepper 
 Nick Vincent 
 Pietra Wexstun
 Lyle Workman
 Matt Yelton

Musicians on live disc
 Frank Black 
 Billy Block
 Eric Drew Feldman 
 Duane Jarvis
 Jack Kidney

Technical
 Frank Black – producer (tracks 1–12) 
 Eric Drew Feldman – producer (tracks 1–9)
 Al Clay – producer (tracks 5–9)
 Frank Black and the Catholics – producer (tracks 13, 14, 19)
 Nick Vincent – producer (tracks 15–18, 20, 21)
 Stan Ridgway – producer (track 22) 
 Ben Mumphrey – producer (track 19, live disc), mixing (live disc)
 Mark Lemhouse – producer (hidden track 23)

References

Black Francis albums
2007 compilation albums
2007 live albums
Cooking Vinyl compilation albums
Cooking Vinyl live albums